Discrimination of excellence is the unjust treatment of outperformers and overachievers. Discrimination against outperformers  includes the critique of unfair treatment in non-merit-based admissions practices, degree conferral or promotion standards. Unfair treatment of outperformers occurs when focusing away from merit or biases lead to economic inefficiency or suboptimal choice in the wake of intransparent, arbitrary or nepotistic decision-making. Discrimination against excellent students during admissions is thematized in Ivy League admission debates and legally scrutinized in the context of individuals outperforming on standardized college admission tests but not being admitted.  Discrimination of excellence evidence is found in most outstanding students failing a PhD degree conferral and intransparent promotion criteria systemically biasing against outperformers and overachievers.

Foundation
Discrimination is unjust or prejudicial treatment of different categories of people or things. Attempts exist to legally abolish, economically counter-weight and societally alleviate the negative consequences of discrimination around the world. 
The Fifth and Fourteenth Amendments to the United States Constitution ban the federal and state governments from discriminating. The United States Employment Discrimination laws seek to prevent discrimination based on race, sex, sexual orientation, religion, national origin, physical disability, and age by employers.  The United States Equal Employment Opportunity Commission lists as especially sensitive areas of discrimination attention age, disability, equal pay and compensation, genetic information, harassment, national origin, pregnancy, race and color, religion, retaliation, sex and sexual harassment.
The European Union introduced an Anti-Discrimination Directive to ban discrimination on the grounds of age, disability, religion or belief and sexual orientation.  The Lisbon Treaty on European Union and the Treaty on the Functioning of the European Union serves as legal protection against discrimination acknowledging equal rights for all human to be treated unbiased and with equal fairness and dignity.

Higher education discrimination
Discrimination of excellence includes the 2019 college admission fraud scandals, standardized admission test outperformers suing a U.S. higher education institution and the United States Department of Justice scrutinizing higher education over potential systemic biases in college admission standards that would underweight transparent standardized testing criteria.

University and college admission and promotion criteria are critical career gatekeeping events, in which unexpectedly overweighting intransparent, non-merit based criteria can result in merit-based outperformers underperforming in admissions. Discrimination bias can occur in merit-based up-or-out placement and promotion criteria in hierarchical rank orders, when performance is partially measured on intangible or intransparent performance criteria implying potential economic inefficiency.

Economic foundations
Outperformance is the foundation of excellence. Overachievement is related to investments.  Outperformance and overachievement are bases of the intellectual elites and related to luxury consumption.

Overachievement may instigate economic growth. John Maynard Keynes' multiplier effect attributes investments of overachievers as some of the drivers of economic growth.  Investments of the striving elite multiply in economic spending in the overall economy. Too-big-to-fail bailout and leadership arguments back the idea of bundling excellence in elites, whose larger-scaled overachiever projects are funded by long-term investments that stimulate economic growth.

Consumption of the elite is an economic growth factor. Thorstein Veblen's trickling down of excellence emphasizes that luxury consumption is a driver of economic growth and accelerator of social enhancement and cultural advancement. Conspicuous consumption may motivates others to strive to consume as well. 

The American Dream ideals of striving to outperform are foundations of economic productivity.

Economic inefficiencies of discrimination of excellence range from lost economic potential and inefficiencies, career-switching costs and diminishing human capital and labor productivity.  Health and societal risks experienced in the wake of discrimination imply social, socio-psychological and emotional burdens.

Historical foundations
Slowing down overachievers and abolishing intellectual outperformance has occurred throughout history.  Various regimes attempted to eradicate, cut down or slow performance and discourage individual striving.

Societal structure
Discrimination of excellence theory  integrates the 'übergroup' in the social psychology social identity theory categorization of society into so-called 'ingroups' and 'outgroups.' 'Übergroups' capture the societal position of natural strivers who outperform and therefore are prone to face discrimination of excellence.

Socio-demographic prevalences include age groups, hierarchical positions and seniority principles that may breed discrimination of excellence.

Socio-psychological motives
Socio-psychological motives and emotions that cause and accompany discrimination of excellence include envy, jealousy, inferiority complex, reputation greed and suboptimal group norms.

Alleviation strategies
Excellence is an asset of the economy and society. Protection from discrimination is grounded in human beings being treated with equal respect and dignity.  Respect for excellence offers individual well-being derived from dignity, economic prosperity grounded in large-scale individuals' striving and societal advancement founded on overachieving elites.

Legal codifications, economic action and public policy as well as corporate workplace incentives protect performance free from discrimination.  Awareness building, transparency and mandatory access to information on hiring, testing and promotion criteria appear as natural remedies besides legal action to combat discriminating individuals, institutional and systemic structures. 

Cultures-of-excellence safe havens but also rescue funds for those whose career has taken a hit due to discrimination of excellence are discrimination alleviation strategies.

Transmission of excellence 

In order to overcome a performance polarization between übergroups and outgroups, übergroups can transfer performance strategies to potentially underperforming outgroups, who can offer in lieu knowledge on discrimination coping strategies.  The strategic alliance of out- and underperformers offers a more productive and anti-discrimination-sensitive workplace, economy, democracy and society.

See also

 Tall poppy syndrome

References 

Excellence
Giftedness